Parommidion extricatum is a species of beetle in the family Cerambycidae. It was described by Martins in 1974.

References

Graciliini
Beetles described in 1974